Siuruanjoki is a river of Finland. It is a most western notable tributary of the Iijoki.

See also
List of rivers in Finland

Rivers of Finland
Iijoki basin
Rivers of Pudasjärvi
Rivers of Oulu